The Northern Ireland Football League (commonly abbreviated to NIFL), known as Irish League, is the national football league of Northern Ireland. The Irish League was originally formed in 1890, with the league in its current format created in 2013 to assume independent collective management of the top three levels of the Northern Ireland football league system; namely the Premiership, Championship and Premier Intermediate League.

In addition to the league divisions, the NIFL also operates the Northern Ireland Football League Cup for its member clubs, as well as the NIFL Development League and George Wilson Cup for their reserve teams, and the NIFL Youth League and NIFL Youth League Cup for their youth teams. Operated as a limited company, the 36 member clubs act as shareholders with one vote each. The NIFL is the successor to the Irish Football League, which, upon its formation in 1890, was historically the league for the entire island of Ireland until it became Northern Ireland's national league after the partition of Ireland in 1921.

Linfield are the current champions, after winning the 2021–22 title on 30 April 2022 with a 2–0 win against Coleraine on the final day of the season. This was a world record 56th top flight league title.

History

Senior

Originally formed in 1890, the Irish Football League, is the second-oldest national league in the world, being formed a week earlier than the Scottish Football League. Only the English Football League is older. (The Dutch Football League formed properly on the same year as the Scottish and Irish leagues, making it the first league in Continental Europe. Although it did have two previous seasons, thus making it equal in duration with the EFL, these two seasons did not have an equal number of matches per club). 

The Irish Football League was originally formed as the football league for, in theory, all of Ireland (although, for cultural reasons, all of its member clubs were in fact based in two zones: initially in what would become Northern Ireland, and, from 1900, in Dublin). It became the league for Northern Ireland in 1921 after partition, with a separate league and association (the Football Association of the Irish Free State – now called the Football Association of Ireland) – being formed for the Irish Free State (now the Republic of Ireland). The league's records from its days in operation as the league for all of Ireland stand as the records for Northern Ireland (as is the case for the Northern Ireland national football team).

In its first season, seven of the eight teams came from Belfast, and the league – and Irish football – continued to be dominated by Belfast clubs for many years. In 1892, Derry Olympic became the second non-Belfast side, but only lasted for one season. In 1900, Derry Celtic joined the league and, in 1901, a second Derry team, St Columb's Court, was added. St Columb's Court lasted just one season, before being replaced by the league's first Dublin team, Bohemians, in 1902. Another Dublin side, Shelbourne, was added in 1904. In 1911 Glenavon, from the County Armagh town of Lurgan replaced Bohemians, who resigned from the league, but were re-admitted in 1912. During 1912 there were three Dublin sides, with the addition of Tritonville, but, like Derry Olympic and St Columb's Court before them, they lasted just one season. Derry Celtic also dropped out in 1913, so that when the Irish League split in 1921, Glenavon was the only non-Belfast team left. No southern clubs (from what would become the Irish Free State and later the Republic of Ireland) ever won the championship. The highest place achieved by any of these clubs was second, by Shelbourne in 1906–07.

During the 1920s, however, the league expanded and soon achieved a wide geographic spread across Northern Ireland. Nonetheless, no club from outside Belfast won the League championship for the first 62 years of its existence, until Glenavon took it to Co. Armagh in 1951–52. In 1957–58, Ards became the first team from Co. Down to win the League, and in 1964–65, Derry City were the first Co. Londonderry club to do so. Derry City – now of the League of Ireland – played in the Irish League from 1929 until 1972 and won the title in 1965, but eventually resigned during the Troubles after the League voted narrowly to continue a ban on their home ground imposed by the security forces, even after the security forces had lifted it.

Historically, with relatively few league fixtures each season, the Irish League organised a number of other competitions for its members. While some of these once enjoyed considerable prestige, they have been phased out over the years due to fixture congestion caused by the expansion of the league, and reduced spectator interest. These competitions were: the City Cup; the Gold Cup; the Ulster Cup and the Irish League Floodlit Cup. In addition, clubs still compete in their respective regional cup competitions: the County Antrim Shield (for clubs within the jurisdiction of the North-East Ulster F.A., also known as the County Antrim & District F.A.); the Mid-Ulster Cup (for clubs within the jurisdiction of the Mid-Ulster F.A.); and the North West Senior Cup (for clubs within the jurisdiction of the North-Western F.A.).

From 1995–96 until 2002–03, the senior League was split into two divisions: the Premier Division and First Division. From 2003-16, there was a single division, albeit with relegation to intermediate leagues below, and from 2016 there are two senior divisions (Premiership and Championship). In 2003, the Irish Football Association took direct charge of Northern Ireland's top flight with the creation of the Irish Premier League (IPL). As in England and Scotland, the old Irish Football League retained a separate existence, but controlling only two feeder leagues: the First Division and Second Division. In 2004, the IFA took over control of the remaining IFL divisions and renamed them as the IFA Intermediate League First Division and Second Division, effectively winding up the Irish Football League after 114 years.

The first ever Irish League match to be broadcast live on television took place on 24 September 2007 when Sky Sports showed Cliftonville and Linfield draw 2–2 at Solitude. In 2008, the IFA took over responsibility for the Senior League under the name IFA Premiership, and the IFA Intermediate League was replaced by the IFA Championship. After five years under the auspices of the IFA, it was decided to create a single Northern Ireland Football League to assume responsibility for all the national leagues from the 2013–14 season.

Intermediate

The NIFL Premier Intermediate League, as the highest-level of intermediate football in Northern Ireland, is the successor to the intermediate-status IFA Championship (2008-16), IFA Intermediate League (2004-08), the Irish Football League First Division (2003-04) during its last season (when it had intermediate status), and ultimately the Irish League B Division (latterly known as the Irish League Second Division).

The B Division of the Irish League was founded in 1951, and originally consisted of the reserve teams of the senior Irish League clubs alongside some of the top intermediate clubs. The B Division was split geographically into North and South sections in 1974 (with a play-off to determine the winners in 1974–75 and 1975–76), and then into Section 1 (containing the intermediate clubs) and Section 2 (the reserve teams of senior clubs) in 1977.

In 1999, the B Division Section 1 was renamed as the Irish League Second Division, and Section 2 became the Reserve League.

There was never any automatic promotion and relegation between either the B Division or Second Division and the senior Irish League.

In 2003, the Irish Premier League was formed by the top sixteen senior teams in the senior Irish League (which, since 1995 had been divided into a Premier Division and a First Division). The four remaining senior teams reverted to intermediate football, along with the top eight teams from the previous year's Second Division - in the Irish League First Division (which now became the top intermediate league), with the Second Division continuing with twelve teams. Automatic promotion and relegation between senior and intermediate football was introduced. There was also automatic promotion and relegation between the two divisions of the (now intermediate-status) Irish League.

In 2004, the Irish Football League was wound up and replaced by the IFA Intermediate League, consisting of two divisions of twelve, with promotion and relegation between the two. This continued for four seasons, until the Championship was created.

For one season only, 2008–09, there was also an IFA Interim Intermediate League for those former members of the IFA Intermediate League which had failed to meet the criteria for the Championship. These clubs were given a year to make improvements in order to join the Championship for 2009–10. Ten of the 12 clubs succeeded in meeting the necessary standard in 2009 and the Championship was then divided into two divisions.

In 2010–11, a pyramid system was introduced, with the possibility of promotion and relegation between Championship 2 and the four regional intermediate leagues, namely the:

Ballymena & Provincial League
Mid-Ulster Football League
Northern Amateur League
Northern Ireland Intermediate League

Clubs in these leagues may only gain promotion to the Championship if they win their respective league championship and meet the necessary criteria. In the event that more than one league champion meets the criteria, only one will be promoted, to be decided by a play-off or series of play-offs.

In 2013, the Northern Ireland Football League assumed responsibility from the IFA for the Championship, which became two intermediate divisions of the NIFL and was renamed as the NIFL Championship.

In 2016, Championship 1 acquired senior status and Championship 2 was renamed as the Premier Intermediate League, thus succeeding the Championship as the top intermediate league in Northern Ireland.

2022–23 membership
Listed below are the 36 member clubs for the 2022–23 season.

UEFA coefficient and ranking

In UEFA ranking for the period of 2017-2022 Northern Irish league is ranked 42 out of 55 leagues. NIFL gradually improves its position, for the period of 2012-2017 league was ranked 47 out of 54 leagues.

 40  8.125
 41  8.125
 42  8.083
 43  8.000
 44  7.250
 Full list

Senior

List of champions and runners-up

Bold indicates team achieved a Double – winners of league and Irish Cup

 Bold italic  indicates team achieved a Treble – winners of league, Irish Cup and at least one other national trophy

Irish Football League (1890–1995)

Irish Football League Premier & First Division (1995–2003)

Irish Premier League (2003–2008)

IFA Premiership (2008–2013)

NIFL Premiership (2013–2016)

NIFL Premiership & Championship (2016–)

Summary of champions

Performance by club
Clubs in italics either no longer exist (Belfast Celtic, Queen's Island) or no longer compete for the title (Derry City).

Records
The first Irish League champions were Linfield, and the first runners-up were Ulster. Of the 121 completed championships, the title has only been taken out of Belfast on ten occasions. The last club to do so was Portadown in 2001–02. They are also the most successful provincial club, with four championships overall.

In 1921–22, Linfield famously achieved the feat of winning seven trophies; the Irish League, Irish Cup; City Cup, Gold Cup; County Antrim Shield; Belfast Charities Cup and Alhambra Cup. In 1961–62, the club achieved a similar feat, winning six trophies; the Irish League; Irish Cup; City Cup, Gold Cup; Ulster Cup and County Antrim Shield. They also lifted the North-South Cup as a seventh trophy, however that was actually the conclusion of the 1960–61 competition, as fixture congestion meant that the cup could not be completed before the end of the previous season.

The record for consecutive league titles is six, which has been achieved by two clubs. Belfast Celtic won five consecutive titles between 1935–36 and 1939–40, before the suspension of the league in 1940 due to World War II. On the resumption of the league in 1947–48 they won their sixth consecutive title, albeit eight years after the fifth. Linfield are the only club to achieve six consecutive titles without a hiatus, from 1981–82 to 1986–87. The longest gap between title wins is the 88 years separating Cliftonville's wins in 1909–10 and 1997–98. A total of 12 different clubs have won the championship, Linfield holding the record for the most wins (56).

Tiebreakers
In the 1905–06 season, the championship title was shared after Cliftonville and Distillery could not be separated after two play-off matches. This is the only occasion in the league's history that the title has been shared. Using the modern award of 3 points for a win, Distillery would have been crowned champions by one point. However, if goal difference had been used instead, Cliftonville would have won the title with a goal difference of +9 compared to Distillery's +7. In the 1992–93 season, Linfield became the first club to win the championship on goal difference, when they finished level on 66 points with Crusaders, but eight goals better with a +34 goal difference to Crusaders' +26.

Before goal difference was introduced, if the top two teams finished the season with the same number of points, the championship title was decided by a play-off. Nine such championship play-offs took place over the years as follows:

Unbeaten seasons
On seven occasions, a team has completed a league campaign unbeaten. Linfield have done so four times, but with fewer fixtures relative to Belfast Celtic's unbeaten seasons in 1926–27 and 1928–29. Glentoran were the last club to finish an entire league season unbeaten, when they won the 1980–81 Irish League title by two points after completing 22 league games without defeat. They again came close in the 1991–92 Irish League season, losing only once in 30 league games. Linfield also came close in the 2003–04 Irish Premier League season, when they too lost just one league game all season. Across the 2005–06 and 2006–07 seasons, Linfield lost just two out of 60 league games in two seasons - one in each season. Coleraine also came close in the 2017–18 season, losing just once in 38 league games.

Senior club membership history
A total of 46 different clubs have been members of the senior league since its inception - ten of which have been members for only one season. The newest members are Warrenpoint Town, who joined the league in 2013 for the first time. That was the second consecutive season that a new member club had made its first appearance in the league, following Ballinamallard United's debut a year earlier in 2012.  Three clubs – Cliftonville, Glentoran and Linfield – have retained unbroken membership since 1890: 130 years and 119 seasons (due to eleven suspended seasons).

In 1891, the league expanded to ten clubs, but shrank again after only one season to six clubs for the 1892–93 season. Only four clubs competed in 1892–93 and 1893–94, then six clubs for the following season, until a membership of eight was achieved for the 1901–02 season. With the exception of one season (1912–13) in which there were ten clubs, membership stayed at eight until the southern clubs resigned in 1920, anticipating the formation of the separate League of Ireland in what would become the Irish Free State. (The League was suspended from 1915 to 1919 because of the First World War.) Prior to the split, three southern clubs had participated in the League: Bohemians, Shelbourne and Tritonville. In the early years, Army regiments stationed in Ireland had also participated in the League: the Lancashire Fusiliers in 1891–92; the North Staffordshire Regiment for three seasons from 1896–99; the Royal Scots in 1899–1900 and the King's Own Scottish Borderers in 1903–04.

Only five and six clubs competed in 1920–21 and from 1921–23 respectively, but expansion began with the admission of four new clubs in 1923, another two in 1924 and a further two in 1927, giving a membership of fourteen from 1927 until the League was suspended in 1940 because of the Second World War. When the League resumed in 1947 it was reduced to twelve clubs, and stayed at this number until 1983 when membership was increased to fourteen.

In 1990, a further two clubs brought the membership to sixteen, and the League was divided into two divisions (the Premier and First Divisions) of eight in 1995, with promotion and relegation between the two. In 1996 the results from the Premier Division and the First Division started to be featured on the Press Association vidiprinter. In 1997, membership increased again to eighteen, with ten in the Premier Division and eight in the First Division. Between 1999 and 2003, the League had a record twenty clubs in membership. From 1999 to 2002, ten clubs each competed in the Premier and First Divisions and in 2002–03 there were twelve in the Premier Division and eight in the First Division.

In 2003, with the creation of the Irish Premier League, the senior league was reduced to a single division of sixteen clubs, although for the first time with relegation to, and promotion from, a league below (a rump Irish Football League in 2003–04 and subsequently the IFA Intermediate League). In 2008, with the creation of the IFA Premiership, the league was reduced to twelve. The Northern Ireland Football League was formed in 2013 to assume independent collective management of the top three levels of the Northern Ireland football league system, which had been under the direct management of the Irish Football Association: namely the IFA Premiership and both divisions of the IFA Championship.

In 2016, the NIFL Championship was given senior status.

Membership summary
Listed below are all the senior League members from 1890 up to and including the 2022–23 season in the following competitions:
Irish Football League (1890–1995)
Irish Football League Premier and First Divisions (1995–2003)
Irish Premier League (2003–2008)
IFA Premiership (2008–2013)
NIFL Premiership (2013–2016)
NIFL Premiership & Championship (2016–present)

{|class="wikitable collapsible"
! style="background:silver;" | Club
! style="background:silver;" | Location
! style="background:silver;" | No. seasons in league
! style="background:silver;" | Membership years
|- 
|Cliftonville ||Belfast ||122 || 1890–
|-
|Glentoran ||Belfast ||122 || 1890–
|-
|Linfield ||Belfast ||122 || 1890–
|-
|Lisburn Distillery ||Ballyskeagh ||112 || 1890–2013
|-
|Glenavon ||Lurgan ||100 || 1911–2004, 2005–
|-
|Portadown ||Portadown ||91 || 1924–2008, 2009–
|-
|Coleraine ||Coleraine ||89 || 1927–
|-
|Ards ||Newtownards ||84 || 1923–2006, 2013–2014, 2016–
|-
|Ballymena United ||Ballymena ||82 || 1934–
|-
|Crusaders ||Belfast ||73 || 1949–2005, 2006–
|-
|Bangor ||Bangor ||70 || 1927–2003, 2008–2009
|-
|Larne ||Larne ||60 || 1923–1940, 1972–2008, 2016–
|-
|Newry City ||Newry ||45 || 1923–1940, 1983–2011
|-
|Belfast Celtic ||Belfast ||38 || 1896–1920, 1924–1949
|-
|Derry City ||Derry ||36 || 1929–1972
|-
|Carrick Rangers ||Carrickfergus ||29 || 1983–2003, 2011–2012, 2015–
|-
|Dungannon Swifts ||Dungannon ||26 || 1997–
|-
|Ballyclare Comrades ||Ballyclare ||20 || 1990–2003, 2016–
|-
|Institute ||Drumahoe ||18 || 1999–2006, 2007–2010, 2014–2015, 2016–
|-
|Omagh Town ||Omagh ||15 || 1990–2005
|-
|Bohemians ||Dublin ||13 || 1902–1911, 1912–1920
|-
|Derry Celtic ||Derry ||13 || 1900–1913
|-
|Limavady United ||Limavady ||13 || 1997–2008, 2017–2019
|-
|Shelbourne ||Dublin ||12 || 1904–1920
|-
|Ballinamallard United ||Ballinamallard ||11 || 2012–
|-
|Loughgall ||Loughgall ||10 || 2004–2007, 2016–
|-
|Warrenpoint Town ||Warrenpoint||10 || 2013–
|-
|Armagh City ||Armagh ||8|| 1999–2003, 2005–2008, 2016–2017
|-
|Queen's Island ||Belfast ||8 || 1921–1929
|-
|Dergview ||Castlederg||7 || 2016–
|-
|Harland & Wolff Welders ||Belfast||7 || 2016–
|-
|Knockbreda ||Belfast||7 || 2016–
|-
|Ballymena ||Ballymena ||6 || 1928–1934
|-
|Newry City AFC ||Newry||6 || 2017–
|-
|Ulster ||Belfast ||6 || 1890–1894, 1901–1903
|-
|Barn ||Carrickfergus ||5 || 1923–1928
|-
|Donegal Celtic ||Belfast ||5 || 2006–2008, 2010–2013
|-
|Dundela ||Belfast ||5 || 2018–
|-
|Annagh United ||Portadown||4 || 2016–2017, 2020–
|-
|PSNI ||Belfast||4 || 2016–2020
|-
|North Staffordshire Regiment ||Army team||3 || 1896–1899
|-
|Queen's University ||Belfast||3 || 2019–22
|-
|Ligoniel ||Belfast ||2 || 1891–1892, 1893–1894
|-
|Lurgan Celtic ||Lurgan||2 || 2016–2018
|-
|Oldpark ||Belfast ||2 || 1890–1892
|-
|Clarence ||Belfast ||1 || 1890–1891
|-
|Derry Olympic ||Derry ||1 || 1892–1893
|-
|King's Own Scottish Borderers ||Army team||1 || 1903–1904
|-
|Lancashire Fusiliers ||Army team||1 || 1891–1892
|-
|Milford ||Milford||1 || 1890–1891
|-
|Milltown ||Belfast||1 || 1891–1892
|-
|Newington ||Belfast||1 || 2022–
|-
|Royal Scots ||Army team||1 || 1899–1900
|-
|St Columb's Court ||Derry||1 || 1901–1902
|-
|Tritonville ||Dublin||1 || 1912–1913
|-
|YMCA ||Belfast ||1 || 1891–1892
|}
Bold – a current member
Italics – a club no longer in existence, or no longer competing in Northern Irish football

Relegation and promotion history
1995–2003 (Two senior divisions)
Between 1995–96 and 2002–03, the league was split into two divisions, with promotion and relegation between the two as follows.

2003–2016 (One senior division)
At the end of the 2002–03 season, the league was reformed as the single-division Irish Premier League. Four clubs were relegated to intermediate football, and from then until 2014-15 there was relegation and promotion between a single senior Irish League division and the top intermediate league below (now NIFL Championship).

2016–present (Two senior divisions)
At the end of the 2015–16 season, the Championship acquired senior status and the league reverted to two senior divisions, with promotion and relegation between those divisions, and between the second senior tier (the Championship) and the top intermediate division below (now NIFL Premier Intermediate League).

Intermediate

List of champions

Irish Intermediate League (1915–1954)

† Elected to senior football

Irish League B Division (1951–1977)

Irish League B Division Section 1 (1977–1999)

Irish League Second Division (1999–2003)

Irish League First & Second Division (2003–04)

IFA Intermediate League First & Second Division (2004–2008)

IFA Championship & Interim Intermediate League (2008–09)

IFA Championship 1 & 2 (2009–2013)

NIFL Championship 1 & 2 (2013–2016)

† Elected to senior football
‡ Promoted to senior football

NIFL Premier Intermediate League (2016–)

‡ Promoted to senior football

Summary of champions

Knock-out competitions

In 1982, a knock-out competition for members was introduced, known as the B Division Knock-out Cup and sponsored by Smirnoff. It was discontinued after 2002, but a new IFA Intermediate League Cup was played between 2004 and 2008, sponsored in its first season by the Daily Mirror and thereafter by Carnegie. In 2008–09, there was no knock-out competition for Championship clubs, who participated with Premiership clubs in the Irish League Cup. In the 2009–10 season only, however, while Championship 1 clubs continued to participate in the Irish League Cup, a Championship 2 League Cup was inaugurated for those in Championship 2. From 2010–11 onwards, all Championship clubs from divisions 1 and 2 also competed in the Irish League Cup, and the Championship 2 League Cup''' was abolished.

Summary of winners

Notes

References

External links
Official website

2013 establishments in Northern Ireland
Sports leagues established in 2013
Sports leagues established in 1890
Professional sports leagues in the United Kingdom